The Pluviôse-class submarines were a group of 18 submarines built for the French Navy in the first decade of the 20th century. Before World War I, two were accidentally lost, but one of these was salvaged and put back into service. Four others were lost during the war and the survivors were stricken in 1919.

Design and description
The Pluviôse class were built as part of the French Navy's 1905 building program to a double-hull design by Maxime Laubeuf. The submarines displaced  surfaced and  submerged. The submarines had a crew of 2 officers and 23 enlisted men.

For surface running, the boats were powered by two  triple-expansion steam engines, each driving one propeller shaft using steam provided by two Du Temple boilers. When submerged each propeller was driven by a  electric motor.

A ministerial order of 18 March 1910 added one to  while she was still under construction, but the bow tubes were deleted from the rest of the class. All of the boats were fitted with six 450 mm external torpedo launchers; the pair firing forward were fixed outwards at an angle of seven degrees and the rear pair had an angle of five degrees. Following a ministerial order on 22 February 1910, the aft tubes were reversed so they too fired forward, but at an angle of eight degrees. The other launchers were a rotating pair of Drzewiecki drop collars in a single mount positioned on top of the hull at the stern. They could traverse 150 degrees to each side of the boat. The Pluviôse-class submarines carried eight torpedoes; those with bow tubes carried their reload in the torpedo compartment.

Ships in class

Service
The Pluviôse class were acknowledged to be good sea boats and saw action throughout the First World War on patrol and close blockade duty. Of the eighteen built, five were lost.
One was accidentally lost prior to the war, in 1912.

See also 
List of submarines of France

Notes

Bibliography

External links

French Submarines: 1863 - Now 
Sous-marins Français 1863 -  (French)

Submarine classes
 
 
Ship classes of the French Navy